Alan Herbert is a Canadian politician and activist, who was an NPA member of Vancouver City Council from 1996 to 1999.

A prominent gay activist in Vancouver, Herbert was instrumental in securing a liquor license for the Fountainhead Pub, one of the city's primary gay bars, and in helping to develop Davie Village. He was also a chair of the Vancouver Pride Society and AIDS Vancouver, and a founder of McLaren House, Canada's first housing centre for people with HIV and AIDS.

However, Herbert's activism in securing the Fountainhead liquor license resulted in his becoming one of two candidates, along with Nancy Chiavario, dropped from the NPA's candidate slate in the 1999 municipal elections. He entered discussions with the Coalition of Progressive Electors to join their slate, but COPE had room for only one of the two candidates and chose Chiavario. He ran as an independent candidate, but was not re-elected to council.

In the 2002 municipal elections, Herbert and Chiavario were both involved in the creation of vcaTeam, a new candidate slate which was not successful in electing candidates to council.

Herbert has continued to participate in Vancouver politics as an activist. He remains on the board of the Vancouver Pride Society, participated in the campaign to save St. Paul's Hospital from closure in 2005, and supported transgender activist Jamie Lee Hamilton's 2008 campaign for election to the Vancouver Park Board.

References

Year of birth missing (living people)
Non-Partisan Association councillors
Gay politicians
LGBT municipal councillors in Canada
Canadian LGBT rights activists
Living people
21st-century Canadian LGBT people
Canadian gay men
20th-century Canadian politicians
20th-century Canadian LGBT people
21st-century Canadian politicians